The name Fort Nassau was used by the Dutch in the 17th century for several fortifications, mostly trading stations, named for the House of Orange-Nassau.  It was also the name of a British fort, which was formerly a Dutch fort.

Forts of this name included:

 Fort Nassau (North River), established 1614 in Albany, New York
 Fort Nassau (South River), established 1627 in Gloucester City, New Jersey
 Old Fort of Nassau, established 1697, in The Bahamas, which, as a British fort, was attacked by U.S. Marines in 1776
 Fort Nassau (Ghana), established near Mori
 Fort Nassau (Guyana), on the Berbice River
 Fort Nassau, Banda Islands, on the island of Bandaneira, in Indonesia, constructed in 1609
 Fort Nassau (Curaçao), established as Fort Republiek in 1797

See also  
Nassau (disambiguation)